Mologa was a town in Yaroslavl Oblast, Russia, formerly situated at the confluence of the rivers Mologa and Volga, but now submerged under the waters of the Rybinsk Reservoir.

Mologa existed at least since the 12th century. It was a part of the Principality of Rostov in the early 13th century. Later on, the town was annexed by the Principality of Yaroslavl. In 1321, it became the center of an independent principality. Soon after that, Ivan III annexed Mologa in favor of the Muscovy. Thereupon Mologa's rulers moved to Moscow, where they have been known as Princes Prozorovsky and Shakhovskoy.

In the late 15th century, they relocated a fair from Kholopiy Gorodok (a town 55 km north of Mologa) to Mologa. After that, Mologa turned into one of the most important Russian trade centers with the Asian countries. According to an account by Sigismund von Herberstein, there was a fortress in Mologa.

Following the Time of Troubles, Mologa thrived as a trade sloboda. In the 19th - early 20th centuries, it was a big staging post on the Volga because the town had been located at the beginning of the Tikhvinskaya water system, connecting the Volga with the Baltic Sea.

The flooding of Mologa was ordered in 1935 and following this order, during the construction of the Rybinsk Reservoir and Rybinsk hydroelectric plant, the town was subsequently evacuated and engulfed by water in the 1940s. Previously, Mologa could remain to be an existing city, but a necessity for an increased capacity of Rybinsk hydroelectric plant levered the level of Rybinsk Reservoir being constructed from 98 to 102m above the sea level making Mologa, standing 98m above the sea level, cease its existence. Around 130,000 people were forced to move from Mologa and the surrounding areas and settle in the nearest Slip, Yaroslavl and nearest settlements and regions, as well as Moscow and Leningrad. 294 locals refused to leave their homes and eventually drowned. A monument was erected in 2003 to commemorate those who refused the evacuation order.

In 1992-1993 the level of the Rybinsk Reservoir decreased at 1.5m which permitted historians to organize the first expedition to a visible part of the former city. This resulted in collecting information for the future Mologa Museum and making a film.

April 14 is remembered in Yaroslavl Oblast as the Day of Mologa. On this day, the boats with monks and priests sail to the spot where Mologa used to stand, and hold divine service in front of the upper parts of cross-crowned belfries which are still visible above the water of the artificial lake.

Every second Saturday of August ordinary people visit Mologa's site on board of a ship.

In August, 2014 the water-level became extremely low, which let the former inhabitants of Mologa see their previous homes and wish to visit them on board of a ship.

See also 
 Korcheva
 Flooded Belfry

References

External links
Statistics and history of Mologa 
Photos of a dead city by Dmitri Krasavin 
Mologa - The Memory and Pain by Dmitri Krasavin 
History of Flooding of Mologa  

Submerged places
Geography of Yaroslavl Oblast
Mologsky Uyezd
Defunct towns in Russia
Former populated places in Russia